Luigi Boscolo (22 March 1824 – ?) was an Italian engraver, active in Venice.

Born in Rovigo, he first studied in his hometown, then at the Academy of Ferrara, but at age 16 he was sent to study at the Accademia di Belle Arti of Venice. He was to become professor there, and later knighted. Among his engravings are those of The Bathers by Francesco Hayez, the Magdalen by Natale Schiavoni, works given an award by the Academy of Fine Arts of Milan; The Odalisque also by Schiavoni; a portrait of Carlo Goldoni by Alessandro Longhi, engravings awarded by the Academy of Belle Arti in Venice; the Madonna del Pomo by Giovanni Bellini; a portrait of Malatesta Buglioni by the painter Raffaele Giannetti of Genoa; La Sorpresa del Bechi di Firenze; a Torquato Tasso in the jails of Ferrara, and the Poet Camoens in prison by the painter Luigi Moretti of Venice; and finally five portraits of King Vittorio Emanuele, King Umberto, of Cardinal Silvestri of Rovigo, Conte Spiridione Papadopoli of Venice, and Conte Luigi Camerini of Padua.

References

1824 births
People from Rovigo
Italian engravers
Year of death missing
Accademia di Belle Arti di Venezia alumni
Academic staff of the Accademia di Belle Arti di Venezia